ACOM or Acom may refer to:

 Acom, a Japanese consumer loan company
 Alabama College of Osteopathic Medicine, an American medical school
 The Anglican Church of Melanesia, or the Church of the Province of Melanesia
 Association for Convention Operations Management
 Australian College of Ministries
 Agency.com, Ltd. (former NASDAQ stock ticker symbol)
 Ancestry.com, Inc. (NASDAQ stock ticker symbol)
 Acom International, a former Japanese golf tournament
 Acom-1, a model of Konica Autoreflex 35mm SLR camera